Grand Theft Auto: Vice City is a 2002 action-adventure game developed by Rockstar North and published by Rockstar Games. It is the fourth main entry in the Grand Theft Auto series, following 2001's Grand Theft Auto III, and the sixth instalment overall. Set in 1986 within the fictional Vice City (based on Miami and Miami Beach), the single-player story follows mobster Tommy Vercetti's rise to power after being released from prison and becoming caught up in an ambushed drug deal. While seeking out those responsible, he slowly builds a criminal empire by seizing power from other criminal organisations in the city.

The game is played from a third-person perspective and its world is navigated on foot or by vehicle. The open world design lets the player freely roam Vice City, consisting of two main islands. The game's plot is based on multiple real-world people and events in Miami such as Cubans, Haitians, and biker gangs, the 1980s crack epidemic, the Mafioso drug lords of Miami, and the dominance of glam metal. The game was also influenced by the films and television of the era, most notably Scarface and Miami Vice. Much of the development work constituted creating the game world to fit the inspiration and time period; the development team conducted extensive field research in Miami while creating the world. Grand Theft Auto: Vice City was released in October 2002 for the PlayStation 2, in May 2003 for Windows, and in October 2003 for the Xbox.

Upon its release, Vice City received critical acclaim, with praise particularly directed at its music, gameplay, story, and open world design. However, the game also generated controversy over its depiction of violence and racial groups, sparking lawsuits and protests. Vice City became the best-selling video game of 2002 and has sold over 17.5 million copies. Considered one of the most significant titles of the sixth generation of video games and one of the greatest video games ever made, it won numerous year-end accolades including Game of the Year awards from several gaming publications. 

Since its release, the game has received numerous ports to many gaming platforms. An enhanced version was released for mobile platforms in 2012 for the game's tenth anniversary, and a further enhanced version was released in 2021. Its successor, Grand Theft Auto: San Andreas, was released in October 2004, and a prequel, Grand Theft Auto: Vice City Stories, was released in October 2006.

Gameplay 
Grand Theft Auto: Vice City is an action-adventure game played from a third-person perspective. The player controls criminal Tommy Vercetti and completes missions—linear scenarios with set objectives—to progress through the story. It is possible to have several missions available at a time, as some missions require the player to wait for further instructions or events. Outside of missions, the player can freely roam the game's open world and has the ability to complete optional side missions. Composed of two main islands and several smaller areas, the world is much larger in area than earlier entries in the series. The islands are unlocked for the player as the story progresses.

The player may run, jump, or drive vehicles to navigate the game's world. The player uses melee attacks, firearms and explosives to fight enemies. The firearms include weapons such as the Colt Python, an M60 machine gun and a Minigun. The game's three-dimension environment allows a first-person view while aiming with the sniper rifle and rocket launcher. In addition, the game's combat allows the player to commit drive-by shootings by facing sideways in a vehicle. The game provides the player a wide variety of weapon options—they can be purchased from local firearms dealers, found on the ground, retrieved from dead enemies, or found around the city.

In combat, auto-aim can be used as assistance against enemies. Should the player take damage, their health meter can be fully regenerated through the use of health pick-ups. Body armour can be used to absorb gunshots and explosive damage, but is used up in the process. When health is entirely depleted, gameplay stops and the player respawns at the nearest hospital while losing all weapons and armour and some of their money. If the player commits crimes while playing, the game's law enforcement agencies may respond as indicated by a "wanted" meter in the head-up display (HUD), which increases as the player commits more crimes. On the meter, the displayed stars indicate the current wanted level, and the higher the level, the greater the response for law enforcement (for example, at the maximum six-star level, police helicopters and military swarm to lethally dispatch players).

During the story, Tommy meets characters from various gangs. As the player completes missions for different gangs, fellow gang members will often defend the player, while rival gang members will recognise the player and subsequently shoot on sight. While free roaming the game world, the player may engage in activities such as a vigilante minigame, a fire fighting activity, a paramedic service and a taxi cab service. Completion of these activities grants the player with context-specific rewards. As Tommy builds his criminal empire, the player may purchase a number of properties distributed across the city, some of which act as additional hideouts where weapons can be collected and vehicles can be stored. There are also a variety of businesses which can be purchased, including a pornographic film studio, a taxi company, and several entertainment clubs. Each commercial property has a number of missions attached to it, such as eliminating competition or stealing equipment; once all missions are complete, the property begins to generate an ongoing income available for the player.

Plot 
In 1986, mobster Tommy Vercetti (voiced by Ray Liotta) is released from prison after serving a fifteen-year sentence for murder. His boss Sonny Forelli (Tom Sizemore), seeking to establish drug operations in the south, sends Tommy to Vice City to oversee an important drug deal alongside crooked lawyer Ken Rosenberg (William Fichtner). However, the deal is ambushed by unknown assailants, with Tommy and Ken barely escaping. Angered upon hearing the news, Sonny orders Tommy to recover the drugs, alongside the money he gave to him, under threat of consequences. Seeking information, Ken points Tommy towards retired army colonel Juan Garcia Cortez (Robert Davi), who helped set up the exchange. Expressing regret for the ambush, Cortez promises to find out who masterminded it.

While investigating, Tommy meets with several people who offer him help: music director Kent Paul (Danny Dyer), who maintains connections with the city's criminal underworld; Lance Vance (Philip Michael Thomas), who aided in the deal and lost his brother in the ambush; Texan business tycoon Avery Carrington (Burt Reynolds), who in return enlists Tommy's help with several deals; and drug kingpin Ricardo Diaz (Luis Guzmán), who employs both Tommy and Lance. Eventually, Cortez begins voicing his suspicions that Diaz organised the ambush. Upon further investigation, Lance discovers this to be the truth and, against Tommy's advice, tries to kill Diaz, only to get himself captured. After Tommy saves Lance, the pair find themselves forced to kill Diaz before he can retaliate. With Diaz dead, Tommy takes over his assets and, at Avery's suggestion, works to expand his new criminal empire by forcing businesses to pay him protection money and buying out nearly bankrupt companies to use as fronts for illicit operations. At the same time, Tommy provides assistance to several prominent gang leaders in the hopes they will support his expansion, and helps Cortez flee the city with stolen military equipment.

Eventually, Sonny discovers that Tommy has gained complete control over Vice City's drug trade without cutting the Forellis in. Enraged at his independence, Sonny sends mobsters to forcefully collect money from Tommy's businesses. In response, Tommy kills Sonny's men and severs his ties with him. Later, learning Sonny is personally coming to Vice City to collect what he believes he is owed, Tommy prepares to pay him tribute with counterfeit money. However, Sonny reveals that he was responsible for Tommy's arrest fifteen years prior, and that Lance has betrayed him and allied himself with the Forellis, having felt inadequate in Tommy's presence since his rise to power. A shootout ensues in Tommy's mansion, during which he prevents the Forellis from stealing his money and murders Lance for his betrayal, before finally killing Sonny in a tense standoff. When Ken arrives to a scene of carnage, Tommy quickly reassures him that everything is now fine, as he has finally established himself as the undisputed crime kingpin of Vice City.

Development 

Rockstar North's core 50-person team led the eighteen-month development of Grand Theft Auto: Vice City. Full production began in late 2001, as Grand Theft Auto III was nearing completion; while early development only involved creating 3D models, executive producer Sam Houser said "it really kicked off at the beginning of 2002" and lasted about nine months. After the release of the Windows version of Grand Theft Auto III, the development team discussed creating a mission pack for the game that would add new weapons, vehicles, and missions. Upon further discussion, the team decided to make this concept a stand-alone game, which became Vice City. The game was announced on 22 May 2002, during the Electronic Entertainment Expo. It was Rockstar North's most expensive game at the time, with a budget of US$5 million. On 5 September 2002, the company announced that the release date of 22 October had been postponed until 29 October to meet product demand. By 15 October 2002, development of Vice City stopped as the game was submitted for manufacturing. It was released for the PlayStation 2 on 29 October 2002 in North America, and on 8 November in Europe. Capcom published the game in Japan on 20 May 2004 for PlayStation 2 and Windows. The game was added to the Rockstar Games Launcher in September 2019.

Setting 
The game is set in 1986 in fictional Vice City, which is based heavily on the city of Miami. Vice City previously appeared in the original Grand Theft Auto (1997); the development team decided to reuse the location and incorporate ideas from within the studio and the fanbase. They wanted to satirise a location that was not contemporary, unlike Grand Theft Auto IIIs Liberty City. The team wanted to choose a location that had various similarities and differences to New York City—the inspiration of Liberty City—eventually leading them to Miami, which producer Leslie Benzies describes as "a party town, all sun and sea and sex, but with that same dark edge underneath". Sam Houser called it "the grooviest era of crime because it didn't even feel like it was crime ... it was a totally topsy-turvy back-to-front period of time". The team intended to make Vice City a "living, breathing city", for the player to feel like "life still goes on" while the character is inside a building.

The game's look, particularly the clothing and vehicles, reflect its 1980s setting. Many themes are borrowed from the major films Scarface (1983) and Carlito's Way (1993), the latter for its characterisation and portrayal of nuanced criminals. The television series Miami Vice (1984–89) was also a major influence and was regularly watched by the team throughout development. Art director Aaron Garbut used the series as a reference point in creating neon lighting. In recreating a 1980s setting, the team found it "relatively painless" due to the distinct culture of the time period and the team's familiarity of the era. The art team was provided with large volumes of research, as well as reference photographs from other members of the development team. The team organised field research trips to Miami shortly after the development of Grand Theft Auto III, splitting into small teams and observing the streets.

Story and characters 

The team spent time "solving [the] riddle" of a speaking protagonist, a notable departure from Grand Theft Auto IIIs silent protagonist Claude. Ray Liotta portrayed protagonist Tommy Vercetti. Liotta described the role as challenging: "You're creating a character that's not there before ... It's so intensive". When recording the role, the team used blue screen in order to allow Liotta to visualise "how it's gonna move". The team ensured that the player felt "real affinity" for Tommy, making the narrative a key development interest. Dan Houser described Tommy as "strong and dangerous and prepared to wait for the right opportunity to arrive". Director Navid Khonsari recalled Liotta frequently complaining on set and found him difficult to work with as a result. "In some sessions he was ... into it, but then sometimes ... he was very dark and couldn't work", said Sam Houser. Following the game's success, Liotta reportedly complained that he was underpaid for the role.

The majority of the game's animations were original, with only a few borrowed from Grand Theft Auto III. For the characters, the team used motion capture and stop motion animation techniques; cutscenes use the former, while gameplay movements use a combination of both techniques. The team encountered difficulty in animating motorcycle animations, due in part to the variety of models. Pedestrian character models use skins in Vice City, allowing the artists to produce more realistic characters. There are 110 unique pedestrian models throughout the game world alongside roughly 50 story characters; each character is rendered using twice the amount of polygons and textures found in Grand Theft Auto III. This also impacted the character physics, improving gameplay aspects such as weapon-hit accuracy. Some character models and scenarios were inspired by films such as The Godfather (1972), and the game's presentation was inspired by action television shows of the 1980s. The interplay between Tommy Vercetti and Lance Vance was crafted to be similar to the relationship of Miami Vices Sonny Crockett and Ricardo Tubbs.

Sound design and music production 
The game features 8,000 lines of recorded dialogue, four times the amount in Grand Theft Auto III. It contains over 90 minutes of cutscenes and nine hours of music, with more than 113 songs and commercials. The team was interested in the challenge of creating the game's soundtrack, particularly in contrast to Grand Theft Auto IIIs music, which Sam Houser described as "clearly satirical and its own thing". In developing the radio stations, the team wanted to reinforce the game's setting by collating a variety of songs from the 1980s and therefore performed extensive research. The radio stations were published by Epic Records in seven albums—known collectively as Grand Theft Auto: Vice City Official Soundtrack Box Set—alongside the game in October 2002. Vice City contains about "three times as much" talk radio as Grand Theft Auto III. Producer and talk show host Lazlow Jones stated that the small percentage of station listeners that actually call in are "insane"; in Vice City, the team "bumped it up a notch", emphasising the extremity. Dan Houser felt that the talk stations give depth to the game world.

Critical reception

Initial release 

Grand Theft Auto: Vice City was released to critical acclaim. Metacritic calculated an average score of 95 out of 100, indicating "universal acclaim", based on 62 reviews. It is Metacritic's highest-rated PlayStation 2 game of 2002, and the fifth-highest rated PlayStation 2 game overall, tied with a number of others. Reviewers liked the game's sound and music, open-ended gameplay, and open world design, though some criticism was directed at the controls and technical issues. IGNs Douglass Perry declared it "one of the most impressive games of 2002", and GameSpys Raymond Padilla named the experience "deep, devilishly enjoyable, and unique".

Reviewers generally considered the missions an improvement over Grand Theft Auto III, although some noted occasional awkwardness and frustration. IGNs Perry wrote that the game's missions give the player "a stronger feeling of being inside a story within a world that truly exists". Game Informers Matt Helgeson found the missions to be more complex, and AllGames Scott Alan Marriott felt that the storyline was improved as a result. Marriott also found the lead character of Tommy to be more engaging than Grand Theft Auto IIIs Claude; IGNs Perry felt that Rockstar "found the right person and the right choice", and Edge wrote that Tommy "sweats charisma", commending Ray Liotta's performance.

The game's open world design was praised by reviewers, many of whom felt that it contained more detail and felt more alive than its predecessors. GameSpys Padilla made favourable comparisons between Vice City and Grand Theft Auto IIIs Liberty City, noting the former's level of detail. Game Revolutions Ben Silverman wrote that the game's depth is "unparalleled", praising the world's realism and detail, while AllGames Marriott commended the "ambitious scope in design".

Marriott of AllGame named Vice City an "unforgettable listening experience", and Perry of IGN declared the music as "the most impressive list of songs in a game". Many reviewers commended the game's radio stations and talk radio, and felt that the game's collection of licensed 1980s music fit the tone and time period of the world. The voice acting also received praise; GameSpots Jeff Gerstmann named the cast of characters "colorful and memorable", and IGNs Perry found the voice acting "among one of the best of its kind". Game Revolutions Silverman felt that the acting "gives the story credence".

Many reviewers found that the game offers a better variety of vehicles than Grand Theft Auto III, and found them easier to control; GameSpots Gerstmann named the driving "more exciting and dangerous", and IGNs Perry found the motorcycle's controls pleasing. In addition to the vehicle handling, reviewers noted improvements in the targeting and shooting mechanics, although still recognised issues. Helgeson of Game Informer wrote that "targeting is improved to the point where combat can actually be fun".

Some reviewers recognised an improved draw distance over Grand Theft Auto III, although many identified frame rate drops during hardware-intense sequences. The changes in character models polarised reviews; while GameSpys Padilla and IGNs Perry noted the improvement in character models, Eurogamers Tom Bramwell considered it "maddening to see that character ... models haven't been smartened up at all". The game's artificial intelligence and long load times were frequently criticised in reviews, and many reviewers noted the awkward camera angles and environment during gameplay.

Windows version 

When Vice City was released to Windows in May 2003, it received similar critical acclaim. Metacritic calculated an average score of 94 out of 100, indicating "universal acclaim", based on 30 reviews. It was the highest-rated Windows game on Metacritic in 2003. Reviewers liked the visual enhancements, and were generally positive towards the control improvements.

The port's visuals received a positive response from reviewers. AllGames Mark Hoogland praised the improved car details, environment textures, and weather effects; GameSpots Greg Kasavin echoed similar remarks, noting occasional frame rate drops. GameSpys Sal Accardo commended the draw distance improvements, identifying very few texture issues. IGNs Steve Butts found the port's system requirements to be reasonable, unlike Grand Theft Auto III, and praised the faster load times. Eurogamers Martin Taylor was critical of the visuals, stating that the higher resolutions "aren't kind to the overall visual quality", and criticising the hardware requirements.

The control changes of the port were generally well received. Most reviewers found the targeting and shooting mechanics to be improved with mouse and keyboard controls; Eurogamers Taylor called them "far more fluid", and GameSpys Accardo wrote "there's simply no substitute for aiming with a mouse". However, the driving control changes were widely criticised; IGNs Butts called it "crap". AllGames Hoogland found the controls to be "more forgiving" over time.

Mobile version 

When Vice City was released on mobile devices in December 2012, it received "generally favorable" reviews. Metacritic calculated an average score of 80 out of 100, based on 19 reviews. Reviewers liked the enhanced visuals, but criticism was directed at the touchscreen controls.

The port's visuals were well received. Destructoids Chris Carter felt that they "[suit] the neon and bright pastel veneer", and wrote that the "new lighting effects and smoothed-out engine really allow the game to pop like it never has before". IGNs Justin Davis praised the updated character models, lighting, and textures, and Touch Arcades Eric Ford noted that the "visuals are improved but not in a drastic manner". NowGamer found that the mobile display improves the visual enjoyment of the game, despite the issues with the original game. Tom Hoggins of The Telegraph identified some issues with character models, but stated "the city looks terrific".

Most reviewers criticised the port's touchscreen controls. Pocket Gamers Mark Brown found them "not ideal", but noted that this was also the case in the original game, while Digital Spys Scott Nichols felt that the game "only complicated [the controls] further". IGNs Davis was thankful for the addition of customisable controls, and wrote that they "make the experience much more controllable", and Touch Arcades Ford greatly appreciated the developer's efforts to "make the situation bearable". Destructoids Carter spoke favourably of the controls, despite noting awkward character movement, while The Telegraphs Hoggins found the controls "far more accomplished" than Grand Theft Auto IIIs mobile port.

Commercial performance

Sales 
Within 24 hours of its release, Grand Theft Auto: Vice City sold over 500,000 copies. Within two days of its release, Grand Theft Auto: Vice City sold 1.4 million copies, making it the fastest-selling game in history at the time. It was the highest-selling game of 2002 in the United States; by 2004, the game had sold 5.97 million units, and by December 2007 it had sold 8.20 million. By July 2006, it had sold 7 million copies and earned $300 million in the United States alone. Next Generation ranked it as the highest-selling game launched for the PlayStation 2, Xbox or GameCube between January 2000 and July 2006 in that country, beating Grand Theft Auto III and Grand Theft Auto: San Andreas. In February 2005, it was re-released as part of PlayStation's Greatest Hits selection, indicating high sales. In Japan, Vice City sold about 223,000 copies in its first week and over 410,000 by January 2008. The game earned a "Diamond" award in the United Kingdom, indicating over one million sales. By March 2008, the game had sold 17.5 million units worldwide, making it one of the best-selling PlayStation 2 games.

Accolades 
Grand Theft Auto: Vice City received multiple nominations and awards from gaming publications. It was named the Best PlayStation 2 game at the 1st British Academy Games Awards, the Golden Joystick Awards, and from Entertainment Weekly, IGN, and GameSpot. It was also awarded the prestigious Ultimate Game at the Golden Joystick Awards. The game was awarded Best Action/Adventure Game from the British Academy Games Awards, GameSpot, and IGN. The game's sound also received several awards and nominations: it won Best Music from GameSpot, and was nominated for Best Sound, and it won the award for Sound at the British Academy Games Awards. It won Design at the British Academy Games Awards and was nominated for Best Graphics (Technical and Artistic) by GameSpot. The game was the runner-up for IGN's Reader's Choice Overall Game of the Year and was nominated for GameSpot's award for Best Story. It was awarded Best PC Game at the British Academy Games Awards.

Controversies 
Similar to its predecessors, Vice City generated several controversies. It has been labelled as violent and explicit and is considered highly controversial by many special interest groups. Peter Hartlaub of SFGate noted the game's "mindless violence", but simply attributed it to the developers' attempt to achieve accuracy. Jeremy Pope, who worked on various Rockstar games including Vice City, vowed never to work on violent games again due to their portrayal in mainstream media. In Australia, the game was pre-edited to receive an MA15+ classification; an uncensored version was released in the region in 2010, retaining its classification.

In November 2003, the Haitian Centers Council and Haitian Americans for Human Rights staged a protest in New York publicly criticising the game, contending that it invited the player to harm Haitian immigrants and claiming that it depicted Haitians as "thugs, thieves and drug dealers". In response, Rockstar issued a press release apologising and acknowledging the concern, but insisted that the violence should be taken within the context of the game, which also contains violence towards other ethnic groups. When New York mayor Michael Bloomberg threatened distributor Take-Two Interactive with legal action, the company apologised and removed offensive statements from future copies of the game. In January 2004, North Miami's majority Haitian-American council filed an ordinance to ban the selling or renting of violent games to anyone under 18 without parental permission. The proposal, apparently sparked by Vice City, was supported by North Miami mayor Josaphat Celestin, who stated "We don't believe the First Amendment was written to protect those who want to incite violence". The case was later downgraded from federal court to state court.

On 7 June 2003, 18-year-old Devin Moore shot and killed two Alabamian police officers and a dispatcher before fleeing in a patrol car; he was later apprehended. In statements to police, Moore reportedly said "Life is like a video game. Everybody's got to die sometime". A $600 million lawsuit was filed against Rockstar Games, Take-Two Interactive, Sony Computer Entertainment, GameStop, and Wal-Mart, claiming that Moore frequently played Vice City and that his experience with the game led him to commit the crimes. The plaintiffs' attorney, Jack Thompson, claimed the graphic nature of the game caused Moore to commit the murders. Thompson removed himself from the case Strickland v. Sony in November 2005 after being scrutinised by the judge for unprofessional conduct. In March 2006, the Supreme Court rejected an appeal by the defendants to dismiss the case.

In September 2006, Thompson brought another $600 million lawsuit against Cody Posey, Rockstar Games, Take-Two Interactive, and Sony Computer Entertainment. The lawsuit claimed that 14-year-old Posey played the game obsessively before murdering his father, stepmother, and stepsister on a ranch in Hondo, New Mexico. Posey's defence team argued that he was abused by his father and was taking Zoloft at the time of the killings. The suit alleged that the murders would not have taken place if Posey had not obsessively played Vice City. The case was dismissed in December 2007, as New Mexico held no jurisdiction over Sony or Take-Two.

In July 2017, the Psychic Readers Network (PRN) sued Rockstar over the character named Auntie Poulet, alleging similarities between the character and Youree Harris, who voiced the character. Brandon J. Huffman, a lawyer for Odin Law and Media, noted that PRN's lawsuit faced challenges due to the timing of the lawsuit, as the Eleventh Circuit's statute of limitations for copyright infringement is three years; the lawsuit was filed almost 15 years after the game's release. Huffman added that Take-Two could also claim parody or settle out of court, but that it was unlikely to do either initially.

Legacy 
Mike Snider of USA Today wrote that Vice City "raised the bar for video games", citing its interactivity, violence, and soundtrack. Kotakus Luke Plunkett and PC Magazines Jeffrey L. Wilson both named Vice City the best game in the series, with the former naming it the "perfect Grand Theft Auto experience". The readers of Official UK PlayStation Magazine named Vice City the fourth-greatest PlayStation title ever released. In 2006 Vice City appeared on Japanese magazine Famitsus readers' list of top 100 games; it was one of the only Western titles on the list. Art director Aaron Garbut felt that, alongside its predecessor Grand Theft Auto III and successor San Andreas, Vice City led the trend of open world games.

Ports 
Grand Theft Auto: Vice City was released for Windows on 13 May 2003 in North America and 16 May in Europe, supporting higher screen resolutions and draw distance, and featuring more detailed textures. A GameCube release was planned, but later cancelled. Vice City was bundled with Grand Theft Auto III in a compilation titled Grand Theft Auto: Double Pack, released on the Xbox on 4 November 2003 in North America and 2 January 2004 in Europe. The Xbox version featured a custom soundtrack support as well as improved audio, polygon models, and reflections over the previous ports. Double Pack was later bundled with San Andreas in a compilation titled Grand Theft Auto: The Trilogy, released in October 2005. The Trilogy was also released for OS X on 12 November 2010. For the game's tenth anniversary in 2012, War Drum Studios ported Vice City to several iOS and Android devices. The port is almost identical to the Windows version of the game, but with enhanced visuals and a customisable layout. The iOS version was released on 6 December, while the Android version was briefly delayed to 12 December due to technical issues. This port was also released on Fire OS devices on 15 May 2014. An emulated version of Vice City was released on the PlayStation 3 on 30 January 2013 via the PlayStation Network's PS2 Classics; another emulated version was released for the PlayStation 4 on 5 December 2015, upscaled to 1080p and with support for PlayStation Trophies.

A remastered version of The Trilogy subtitled The Definitive Edition, including Vice City, was released for Windows, Nintendo Switch, PlayStation 4, PlayStation 5, Xbox One, and Xbox Series X/S on 11 November 2021; versions for Android and iOS devices are also in development. Existing versions of the game were removed from digital retailers in preparation for The Definitive Edition, but Rockstar soon announced they would be relisted.

A core team of six fans reverse-engineered the game and released it as an executable in December 2020, having worked on it since May; titled reVC, the project allows the game to be unofficially ported to platforms such as Nintendo Switch, PlayStation Vita, and Wii U. Take-Two issued a DMCA takedown for the project in February 2021. In April, Theo, a New Zealand-based developer who maintained a fork of the source code, filed a counter-notice on GitHub, claiming that the code does not contain any original work owned by Take-Two; per DMCA rules regarding disputes, Theo's content was restored after two weeks. On 10 June 2021, the team behind reVC filed a counter-notice; per DMCA rules regarding disputes, the source code was restored after two weeks. In September 2021, Take-Two filed a lawsuit in California against the programmers, asserting that the projects constitute copyright infringement.

Notes

References

Sources

External links 

 
 

 
2002 video games
Action-adventure games
Android (operating system) games
BAFTA winners (video games)
Cancelled GameCube games
Capcom games
Censored video games
Cultural depictions of the Mafia
D.I.C.E. Award for Action Game of the Year winners
D.I.C.E. Award for Adventure Game of the Year winners
Golden Joystick Award for Game of the Year winners
Golden Joystick Award winners
Grove Street Games games
Interactive Achievement Award winners
IOS games
MacOS games
Nintendo Switch games
Obscenity controversies in video games
Open-world video games
Organized crime video games
PlayStation 2 games
PlayStation 4 games
PlayStation 5 games
PlayStation Network games
Race-related controversies in video games
RenderWare games
Rockstar Games games
Rockstar Vienna games
Single-player video games
Take-Two Interactive games
Video game prequels
Video games about the illegal drug trade
Video games developed in the United Kingdom
Video games produced by Dan Houser
Video games produced by Leslie Benzies
Video games set in 1986
Video games set in Florida
Video games set on fictional islands
Video games with custom soundtrack support
Video games written by Dan Houser
Windows games
Xbox games
Xbox One games
Xbox Series X and Series S games